Ejecta (from the Latin: "things thrown out", singular ejectum) are particles ejected from an area. In volcanology, in particular, the term refers to particles including pyroclastic materials (tephra) that came out of a volcanic explosion and magma eruption volcanic vent, or crater, has traveled through the air or under water, and fell back on the ground surface or on the ocean floor.

Volcanology  
Typically in volcanology, ejecta is a result of explosive eruptions. In an explosive eruption, large amounts of gas are dissolved in extremely viscous lava; this lava froths to the surface until the material is expelled rapidly due to the trapped pressure. Sometimes in such an event a lava plug or volcanic neck forms from lava that solidifies inside a volcano's vent, causing heat and pressure to build up to an extreme with no way to escape. When the blockage breaks and cannot sustain itself any longer, a more violent eruption occurs, which allows materials to be ejected out of the volcano.

Ejecta can consist of:
 juvenile particles – (fragmented magma and free crystals)
 cognate or accessory particles – older volcanic rocks from the same volcano
 accidental particles – derived from the rocks under the volcano

These particles may vary in size; tephra can range from ash (<1/10in), lapilli (little stones from 1/10 in to 2 ½ in) or volcanic bombs (2.5 in+).

Planetary geology 

In planetary geology, the term "ejecta" includes debris ejected during the formation of an impact crater.

When an object massive enough hits another object with enough force, it creates a shockwave that spreads out from the impact. The object breaks and excavates into the ground and rock, at the same time spraying material known as impact ejecta. This ejecta is distributed outward from the crater's rim onto the surface as debris; it can be loose material or a blanket of debris, which thins at the outermost regions.

If enough ejecta are deposited around an impact crater, it can form an ejecta blanket; this blanket is full of dust and debris that originated from the initial impact. The size of this impact crater along with the ejecta blanket can be used to determine the size and intensity of the impacting object.  On earth, these ejecta blankets can be analyzed to determine the source location of the impact.

A lack of impact ejecta around the planet Mars's surface feature Eden Patera was one of the reasons for suspecting in the 2010s that it is a collapsed volcanic caldera and not an impact crater.

Astronomy and heliophysics 
In astrophysics or heliophysics, ejecta refers to material expelled in a stellar explosion as in a supernova or in a coronal mass ejection (CME).

Artificial 

Beside material launched by humans into space with a range of launch systems, some instances particularly nuclear produce artificial ejecta, like in the case of the Pascal-B test which might have ejected an object with a speed of Earth's escape velocity into space.

References

Volcanology
Planetary science
Astrophysics